Mangelia sulcosa is a species of sea snail, a marine gastropod mollusk in the family Mangeliidae.

Description

Distribution
This marine species is endemic to Australia and occurs off Lord Hood & Chain Island, East Australia

References

External links
 

sulcosa
Gastropods described in 1894
Gastropods of Australia